The 2006 UAB Blazers football team represented the University of Alabama at Birmingham (UAB) in the 2006 NCAA Division I FBS football season, and was the sixteenth team fielded by the school. The Blazers' head coach was Watson Brown, who entered his twelfth season, and subsequently final as UAB's head coach. They played their home games at Legion Field in Birmingham, Alabama, and competed as a member of Conference USA. The Blazers finished their eleventh season at the I-A level, and eighth affiliated with a conference with a record of 3–9 (2–6 C-USA).

Schedule

Game summaries

Oklahoma

East Carolina

Georgia

Mississippi State

Troy

Memphis

Rice

Marshall

SMU

UTEP

Southern Miss

UCF

References

UAB
UAB Blazers football seasons
UAB Blazers football